There were two competitions of Hockey at the 1998 Commonwealth Games:

Men's tournament

Medalists

Women's tournament

Medalists 

 
Commonwealth Games
1998 Commonwealth Games events
1998
1998 Commonwealth Games